Franciscan Grammar School of Sinj is one of the oldest educational institutions in Croatia, especially in Dalmatia, and first school in Dalmatia with Croatian as official teaching language. The holder of the school is Franciscan Province of the Most Holy Redeemer for Split.

History
After a number of monastery schools that were organised by a Province of Saint Redemptor for the purpose of schooling its candidates, in 1838 all these schools were associated to Domestic college of the Franciscan Province of Saint Redemptor, that was organised in three levels, located into three convents: Zaostrog, Knin and Sinj. 

In 1854 this dislocated college starts to work in integral institution in Sinj, with the denomination of Public Croatian grammar school in Sinj under government of the Franciscans of Provence of Saint Redemptor. From 1854 the College starts with teaching in Croatian, and becomes the first Croatian grammar school in Dalmatia.  The teaching languages were Italian and/or German, and mostly Latin before.

In the later history, school had got and lost the right of publicity, stelled between various political systems, governments and empires. Although atmosphere was not always so clear, the Privince has not give up and over all its history endeavors to make the school better. In 1908 the present magnificent building of school was built, in famous Alkarsko trkalište (the street in which Sinjska Alka is played), and new professors are schooled for the needs of good teaching. 

In 1939, after years of so-called "partial" right of publicity, school reaches the full right of publicity, with the denomination of Franciscan Grammar School of Sinj with law of publicity. This is its present name.

The name of the school
The school is Franciscan because its founder and owner is Franciscan Province of Saint Redemptor in Split, and because the Franciscan candidates attend it together with other students. Besides the principal education, the Christian point of view is cherished there, and sincerity to every man and creature of the Lord, in the idea of the Saint Francis from Assisi, the founder of the Franciscan Order. 

The school has "with law of publicity" in its name because it is accredited to issue vouchers according to present public law in Republic of Croatia. 

The school is "classical" because it has the classical curriculum, with the special emphasis on classic languages and culture, such as Greek and Latin.

Classes

There are two courses maintained in the Franciscan grammar school in Sinj at present: 
 Classical course
 Language course

The annual-per-week schedule is given in the next table:

Employees
Some of the employees/professors are civils, and some are Franciscans. The majority are professors that schooled for professors in Croatian universities, and some of them have Master of Doctoral degree. 

Head-master of the school is mr. sc. fra Josip Grbavac, prof.

Professors are at present: 
 Iva Čugura, prof. - Philosophy
 Andro Čalo, prof. - Musical Arts
 Marija Ivišić, prof. - Math
 Helena Kodžoman, prof. - Math
 fra Nedjeljko Jukić, prof. - Biology
 Dario Klarić, prof. - Gymnastics
 Radmila Klarić, dipl. ing. - Biology and Chemistry
 Mihaela Miloš, prof. - German and Latin
 Hrvoje Markulin, prof. - Croatian
 fra Ante Branko Periša, akad. slikar - Visual Arts
 dr. sc. fra Jure Hrgović - Greek and Latin
 Anđela Tomašević, prof. - Politics and economy
 Snježana Radan, prof. - Informatics, Physics and Math
 fra Antonio Mravak, prof. - Catechism
 Ivan Vuleta, prof. - History
 Antonija Čarić, prof. - History
 mr. sc. fra Ivan Udovičić - Psychology and Sociology
 Marijana Vuleta, prof. - Croatian
 Dijana Župić, prof. - English
 Marko Zec, prof. - English
 Brankica Jerkan, prof. - Greek and Latin

Alumni

Some of the alumni of the Franciscan grammar school in Sinj made a great contribution to science and social and political atmosphere in Croatia. Some of them are:
 dr. sc. fra Josip Olujić, paleontologist 
 academician Dušan Bilandžić, historiographer
 prof. dr. sc. Anđelko Mijatović, historiographer
 fra Josip Ante Soldo, prof., historiographer

See also
 Croatia
 Dalmatia
 Sinj
 Sinjska Alka
 Croatian

References

External links
  Official website of school
 Official Website of the Province of Saint Redemptor

Catholic schools in Croatia
Franciscan high schools
Buildings and structures in Split-Dalmatia County